Wairopi is a village along the Kumusi River, in Oro Province, Papua New Guinea. The village lies along the Kokoda Track.

History
During the retreat of the ill-fated Imperial Japanese campaign along the Kokoda Track during the Second World War, Japanese Major General Tomitaro Horii drowned while attempting to cross the Kumusi River at Wairopi, after the  battle of Oivi-Gorari.

Notes
Citiations

References

Populated places in Oro Province